2nd Desire (Tasty) is the second extended play by South Korean soloist Kim Woo-seok. It was released on February 8, 2021, under TOP Media. It is available in two versions and contains six tracks, with "Sugar" released as the lead single.

Background 
On January 18, 2021, it was announced that Kim would make his comeback with a new album in February. On February 8, 2021, Kim released his second extended play 2nd Desire (Tasty) along with the lead single "Sugar". On February 18, 2021, Kim received his first ever music show win on M Countdown.

Track listing

Charts

Weekly charts

Singles

Accolades

Release history

References 

2021 EPs
K-pop EPs